The Namibian Air Force is the aerial warfare branch of the Namibian Defence Force. It was commissioned on 13 March 2005 at Grootfontein Air Force Base. Following the independence of Namibia from South Africa in 1990, the Air Defence Wing of the Namibian Defence Force was established on 23 July 1994. The Air Force headquarters is located at Karibib Air Force Base. The policy, mission statements and concept of operations envisage the development of an Air Force to operate in support of the Army and the Navy.

The five separate roles for the Air Force are: surveillance, transport of personnel and transport of supplies/equipment, support to the civil authorities or civil community, and training.

The policy for the Air Force is as follows:
To acquire dedicated air assets to undertake the surveillance and transport tasks.  The MOD and NDF will train and employ their own pilots and technicians.  Co-operation and co-ordination with other Ministries may extend to making such assets available for non-defence tasking. In addition, consideration will be given to arrangements whereby private and other national air assets could be employed where appropriate or necessary.

History
After commissioning in 1994, the air wing was composed of two squadrons, VR-1 squadron and the Helicopter Squadron. The first aircraft of the force were six Cessna O-2As donated by the United States. The US also offered two advisors to train four pilots, six copilots and seven mechanics. In December 1994 a total of four Cheetah and Chetak light utility helicopters bought from Hindustan Aeronautics Limited were delivered to the then Air Wing at Eros Airport. The Indian Air Force also provided a chief engineer, five technicians and two pilots to train Namibian crews for at least six months. Two Harbin Y-12s were delivered in December 1997. In the 1999-2000 period, two Mil Mi-8s and two Mil Mi-25s were delivered by Libya. In 2004, Namibia ordered 12 Chengdu F-7NM fighters and two FT-7NM trainers to China. These were delivered in 2005 and 2006, and officially entered service on 23 June of the latter year.

Aircraft

Aircraft accidents

The Namibian Air Force has suffered a number of aircraft incidents and accidents. The first notable accident occurred during Operation Atlantic in the DRC, where two helicopters — a Cheetah and a Chetak (serials H-702 and H-708) — collided mid-air during bad weather, resulting in the deaths of 11 personnel, five of whom were Namibian. 
 On 1 August 2008, Chetak H-706 crashed resulting in injuries to the crews and passengers near Opuwo.  
 On 30 November 2013, the An-26B registered as NAF-3-642 crash-landed at the disused Omega airfield in Zambezi Region, with the six crew members getting away unhurt. The aircraft was flying to Bagani to collect the remains of the occupants of LAM Mozambique Airlines Flight 470.
 In April 2014, the Harbin Z-9 with serial number H-700 crashed during takeoff at Grootfontein Air Force Base resulting in it being written off.
 On 23 September 2021, a Hongdu JL-8 crashed during landing at Karibib Air Force Base.
 On 15 October 2021, the Chengdu F-7NM with serial number 0315 crashed on landing at the Andimba Toivo ya Toivo Airport. The cause was allegedly a failure of the safety parachute to deploy upon deceleration.

Air Force Bases

List of bases of the Namibian Air Force

Karibib Air Force Base, Karibib
Grootfontein Air Force Base, Grootfontein
Keetmanshoop Air Base, Keetmanshoop

Expansion of the Air Base at Keetmanshoop is planned.

Flying Units
Air Defence Wing
No. 23 Squadron
Fighter squadron, operating Chengdu F-7s.

15 Wing
No. 151 Squadron
Operates the helicopters. This squadron participated in the Second Congo War. In 2013, it lost two helicopters in a mid-air collision.

13 Wing

Hosting the fixed-wing transport aircraft (An-26 and Y-12).

Deployments

National

The Namibian Air Force has deployed numerous times to help civilian authorities during disasters. Health outreach workers have been ferried during immunisation campaigns. It has assisted in transporting electoral material and personnel during national elections. It has also flown foreign heads of state during their stay in Namibia.

International

Democratic Republic of the Congo
Between 1998 and 2002 the air force was deployed to the DRC during the Second Congo War. Harbin Y-12 transport aircraft where used on logistics supply missions to the DRC as well as withdrawing Namibian troops at the end of the war. On 1 August 1999 an air force flight engineer died after he was hit by anti-aircraft fire on a Harbin Y-12 that was en route to resupply Namibian and Zimbabwean troops besieged at Ikela. Two Namibian Alouette helicopters collided in mid-air while on operations during the war due to bad weather on 15 January 1999. The accident claimed nine lives, including two Namibian pilots and three technicians.

Zimbabwe
During the 2014 floods at Tokwe-Murkosi in Masvingo, Zimbabwe, the air force deployed a flight consisting of one Harbin Z-9 and two Alouettes to assist with the evacuation of the affected people. The mission lasted seven days in which 600 residents were airlifted, as well as 56 tons of goods.

Exercise Blue Kavango
The air force deployed a composite flight consisting of a Y-12 transport aircraft and Z-9 light utility helicopters to the SADC air forces exercise Blue Kavango held in Botswana.

Leadership
The Air Force Commander exercise overall Executive command, he is deputized by an Air Commodore . The Air Force Sergeant Major is the principal Warrant Officer that advises the Air Force Commander on matters of discipline.

Command structure

Other establishments and units
School of Air Power Studies
The primary training institute in the Air Force is the School of Air Power Studies (SOAPS) under the Command of Group Captain Hosea Ndjibu. The SOAPS is composed of three centres.

Ranks, Insignia, Uniforms & Proficiency Badges
The Air Force from inception used Army styled ranks and insignia. This however changed in April 2010 when the new system based on stripes was introduced and ranks changed to commonwealth system.

Commissioned officer ranks
The rank insignia of commissioned officers.

Other ranks
The rank insignia of non-commissioned officers and enlisted personnel.

References

Notes

Bibliography

Namibia
Military of Namibia
Military units and formations established in 2005
2005 establishments in Namibia
Military aviation in Africa